The Image of Bruce Lee was originally released in Hong Kong as 猛男大賊脂虎 Meng nan da zei yan zhi hu (International English title: Storming Attacks), although the Bruceploitation title was added for its American release. 

It is a contemporary (1970s) action film about Bruce Li as a special agent who teams with a Hong Kong police officer to crack a smuggling ring (among the smugglers: Bolo Yeung). Apart from the title, the only thing this film has to do with Bruce Lee is when someone tells the Bruce Li character that he resembles Lee.

Reaction
On the website Bruceploitation, 'Keith' more or less sums up the appeal of the film by writing:"Oh yeah kung fu carnage and gratuitous full frontal nudity, with a formula that like that you can't go wrong! I liked this movie it was cool. Every five minutes somebody was getting in a fight except one time, but that was a part with the nudity, so that makes up for it. Watch this movie if you can cuz it's good."

In the fanzine Exit the Dragon, Enter the Tiger, Carl Jones writes:"Image of Bruce Lee has been likened to an episode of The Sweeney with martial arts thrown in. It certainly has the look of a gritty 70's cop show...The fights are good and realistic and Li gets to show some handy moves with a Bokken (wooden Japanese sword) during one particular scrap with the boss's goons."

The film is admired by Quentin Tarantino who wrote "While it maybe lacking in the script department, and the fights, though good, are usually unprovoked and undramatic, the cast is good. "

See also
 List of films in the public domain in the United States

References

External links
 
 

1978 films
1978 martial arts films
1970s martial arts films
Hong Kong martial arts films
Bruceploitation films
Kung fu films
1970s Hong Kong films
1980s Hong Kong films